SOKO Hamburg (English title: Hamburg Homicide) is a German police procedural television series that premiered on 27 March 2018 on ZDF. It is the tenth offshoot of SOKO München, launched in 1978. "SOKO" is an abbreviation of the German word Sonderkommission, which means "special investigative team". The show is filmed in Schleswig-Holstein, Hamburg, and Lower Saxony

See also
 List of German television series

References

External links
 Hamburg Homicide at ZDF
 

2018 German television series debuts
German-language television shows
ZDF original programming